Katie Mack may refer to:

 Katie Mack (astrophysicist), assistant professor at North Carolina State University
 Katie Mack (cricketer) (born 1993), Australian cricketer